The 16531/16532 Ajmer–KSR Bengaluru Garib Nawaz Express, formerly Ajmer–Bengaluru City Garib Nawaz Express/Ajmer–Bangalore City Garib Nawaz Express is an Express train belonging to South Western Railway zone that runs between  and  in India.

Service
It is currently being operated with 16531/16532 train numbers on a weekly basis.

See also 

 Bangalore City railway station
 Gandhidham Junction railway station
 Yesvantpur–Puducherry Weekly Express
 Bhagat Ki Kothi−Bangalore City Express (via Guntakal)
 Gandhidham–Bangalore City Express
 Bhagat Ki Kothi−Bangalore City Express (via Hubballi)

Notes

References

External links 

 16531/Ajmer - KSR Bengaluru Garib Nawaz Express
 16532/KSR Bengaluru - Ajmer Garib Nawaz Express

Transport in Ajmer
Transport in Bangalore
Express trains in India
Rail transport in Rajasthan
Rail transport in Gujarat
Rail transport in Maharashtra
Rail transport in Andhra Pradesh
Rail transport in Karnataka
Railway services introduced in 2002
Named passenger trains of India